SLPP may refer to:

 Sierra Leone People's Party
 Sri Lanka Podujana Peramuna (also known as Sri Lanka People's Front), a political party in Sri Lanka
 Simple Loop Prevention Protocol (Nortel) (see Avaya Simple Loop Prevention Protocol)